Gretchen Corbett is an American actress of film, stage, and television. She began her career as a stage actress, starring in productions at the Oregon Shakespeare Festival before being cast in Broadway productions of After the Rain (1967) and Forty Carats (1968). She made her feature film debut in the comedy Out of It (1969), and subsequently had supporting roles in the horror films Let's Scare Jessica to Death (1971) and The Savage Bees (1976), as well as the drama The Other Side of the Mountain Part 2 (1978). She also appeared on stage in New York-based productions of Henry IV (1970), The Survival of St. Joan (1970–1971), and The Justice Box (1971).

Between 1974 and 1978, Corbett portrayed attorney Beth Davenport on the primetime series The Rockford Files, opposite James Garner. She subsequently starred as a doctor in the supernatural horror film Jaws of Satan (1981), followed by a role in the television drama film Million Dollar Infield (1982). Corbett worked consistently in guest-starring roles on television throughout the 1980s, as well as appearing in regional theater productions. Since the 2000s, she has appeared in numerous stage productions with Portland Center Stage, in her hometown of Portland, Oregon, as well as directing plays. Between 2013 and 2015, she had a recurring guest role on the comedy series Portlandia, and appeared in the Hulu series Shrill in 2019.

Film

Television

Series

Televised plays

Stage

References

Sources

External links
 
 

Actress filmographies
American filmographies